Falley Home, also known as the Lahr Home, is a historic home located at Lafayette, Tippecanoe County, Indiana.  The Italian Villa style brick house was built in 1863, and consists of three two-story sections and a three-story entrance tower.  It is sheathed in stucco.  The square corner entrance tower is topped by a cupola and encloses a curve staircase.

It was listed on the National Register of Historic Places in 1982.

References

Houses on the National Register of Historic Places in Indiana
Italianate architecture in Indiana
Houses completed in 1863
Buildings and structures in Lafayette, Indiana
National Register of Historic Places in Tippecanoe County, Indiana
Houses in Tippecanoe County, Indiana